Tom Price may refer to:

People

Politicians
 Tom Price (South Australian politician) (1852–1909), premier of South Australia
 Tom Price (British politician) (1902–1973), British trade unionist and Labour Party politician
 Tom Price (American politician) (born 1954), former U.S. Secretary of Health and Human Services and former U.S. Representative

Sportspeople
 Tom Price (cricketer) (born 2000), English cricketer
 Tom Price (ice hockey) (born 1954), former ice hockey player
 Tom Price (rower) (born 1933), Olympic gold medalist in rowing 1952
 Tom Price (rugby union) (born 1993), British rugby player
 Tommy Price (1911–1997), British speedway rider

Other people
 Tom Price (actor) (born 1980), British actor
 Tom Price (judge) (born 1945), American judge, served in the Texas Court of Criminal Appeals
 Tom Price (musician) (born 1956), American composer, arranger and conductor

Places 
 Tom Price, Western Australia, town named for Thomas Moore Price, a US businessman, and the highest town in Western Australia
 Mount Tom Price mine, a nearby iron ore mine which is the reason for the town's existence

Characters 
 Tom Price, a character in the 1975 TV series Survivors and the 2008 remake 
 Tom Price, a character in the TV series Somewhere Between

See also
 Thomas Price (disambiguation)
 Tom Pryce (1949–1977), British racing driver
 Thomas Tannatt Pryce (1886–1918), Victoria Cross recipient
 Tom ap Rhys Pryce (1974–2006), British lawyer robbed and murdered by two teenagers

Price, Tom